Siculifer is a monotypic moth genus in the subfamily Arctiinae. Its single species, Siculifer bilineatus, is found in Assam, India. Both the genus and species were first described by George Hampson in 1896.

References

Lithosiini
Monotypic moth genera
Moths of Asia